Kurichikkara  is a village in Thrissur district in the state of Kerala, India.

Demographics
 India census, Kurichikkara had a population of 6279 with 3027 males and 3252 females.

References

Villages in Thrissur district